Albert Hehn (17 December 1908 – 29 July 1983) was a German actor. Hehn appeared in a large number of films between 1938 and 1970. One of his most notable roles was in the 1941 war film Stukas. He was married to the actress Jeanette Schultze.

Selected filmography
 Comrades at Sea (1938)
 Drei Unteroffiziere (1939)
 Legion Condor (1939)
 Stukas (1941)
 Tonelli (1943)
 The Buchholz Family (1944)
 Marriage of Affection (1944)
 Martina (1949)
 Friday the Thirteenth (1949)
 Monks, Girls and Hungarian Soldiers (1952)
 The Mill in the Black Forest (1953)
 The Hunter's Cross (1954)
 The Forest House in Tyrol (1955)
 We're All Necessary (1956)
 The Star of Africa (1957)
 The Battalion in the Shadows (1957)
 Two Bavarians in the Harem (1957)
 The Green Devils of Monte Cassino (1958)
 Rommel Calls Cairo (1959)
 The Scarlet Baroness (1959)
 The Time Has Come (1960, TV series)

References

Bibliography 
 Welch, David. Propaganda and the German Cinema, 1933-1945. I.B.Tauris, 2001.

External links 
 

1908 births
1983 deaths
People from Lauda-Königshofen
People from the Grand Duchy of Baden
German male television actors
German male stage actors
German male film actors
20th-century German male actors
Burials at the Ohlsdorf Cemetery